Eumecosomyia is a genus of picture-winged flies in the family Ulidiidae.

Species
 Eumecosomyia hambletoni
 Eumecosomyia lacteivittata
 Eumecosomyia nubila

References

Ulidiidae
Tephritoidea genera